The Vojislavljević (pl. Vojislavljevići / Војислављевићи) was a Serbian medieval dynasty, named after archon Stefan Vojislav, who wrested the polities of Duklja, Travunia, Zahumlje, inner Serbia and Bosnia from the Byzantines in the mid-11th century. His successors, kings Mihailo I Vojislavljević (d. 1081) and Constantine Bodin (d. 1101) expanded and consolidated the state. During the 12th century, the main line of the Vojislavljević family was ousted by their cadet branch, the Vukanović (which became the Nemanjić dynasty), in the late 12th century.

History

Background

Stefan Vojislav

Stefan Vojislav, the progenitor of the dynasty, was a nobleman in Byzantine service who had the titles of archon, and toparch of the Dalmatian kastra of Zeta and Ston. In 1034 he led an unsuccessful revolt that resulted in his incarceration at Constantinople, he however, managed to escape and return, this time successfully gaining independence of his statelet, which he would rule as Prince of the Serbs, a title signifying supreme leadership among the Serbs. The contemporary Byzantine writers call him a Serb. The Chronicle of the Priest of Duklja, a later, more dubious source, calls him a cousin to previous ruler Jovan Vladimir (r. 990–1016).

Mihailo I

Mihailo I became Prince in 1046. He restored independence and maintained it from the Byzantine Empire. He sought closer relations with other great powers, such as the Pope and the Normans. Mihailo installed his son Petrislav as Prince of Rascia. After the aborted rebellion in Bulgaria, the military governor of Dyrrhachium, Nicephorus Bryennius, restored Byzantine rule to Rascia in 1073. Mihailo reportedly received royal insignia in 1077 from Pope Gregory VII, although this is still a matter of debate. An image of King Mihajlo with his crown is still found in the Church of St. Michael in Ston, a town in the Pelješac peninsula (in present-day Croatia). Mihajlo's rule ended in 1081.

Constantine Bodin

His successor was his son Constantin Bodin, who ruled from 1081 to 1101. Bodin fought Byzantium and Normans further to the south, and took the town of Dyrrachium. He established vassal states in Bosnia (under Stefan) and Raška (under Vukan and Marko), which recognized his supremacy. Vukan and Marko, the new princes of Raška were probably sons of the aforementioned Petrislav. Vukan (1083–1115) was the Grand Župan while Marko headed administration of a part of the land. The Byzantine Emperor Alexios later forced Vukan to acknowledge Byzantine suzerainty in 1094. After Bodin died in 1101, incessant struggles for power among his heirs weakened the state. Bodin had previously exiled Dobroslav, his younger brother, together with their cousin Kočapar. In 1101 they returned, and vied for power together with another grandson of Mihajlo's, Vladimir. Vladimir at one point married the daughter of Vukan of Raška.

Decline
In 1114, Đorđe, son of Constantin Bodin, came to power in Duklja. The next year Vukan was replaced in Raška by his nephew Uroš I. (ca. 1115–1131). Đorđe's rule lasted until 1118.

One of the sons of Uroš I was Zavida, Prince of Zahumlje. His four sons would eventually bring order to the Rascian lands and found the House of Nemanja.

In these struggles, the pro-Raška rulers eventually managed to rise to power in Duklja, culminating in the rise of Stefan Nemanja, one of Zavida's sons (around 1166). His son Stefan Nemanjić restored the old Doclean crown in 1217 by receiving from the Pope regal insignia as "King of all Serbian and Maritime Lands".

List of rulers

Family tree

Stefan Vojislav
Gojslav
Radoslav
Branislav
Kočapar ( 1102–03)
Grubeša
 Gradinja ( 1125–45)
 Radoslav ( 1146–1148, 1162)
 Mihailo III ( 1180–86)
Gradislav
 Berinja
Saganek
 Predimir
 Mihailo I, King of Slavs (Duklja)
Dobroslav II
Vladimir
Konstantin Bodin
Mihajlo II
 Đorđe Bodinović ( 1113–31)
 Petrislav, Prince of Raška (ca. 1050–1083)
 Vukan
 Vukanović dynasty

See also

List of Serbian monarchs

Annotations

References

Sources
Primary sources

 
 
 
 

Secondary sources

 
 
 
 
 
 
 
 
 
 
 
 
 
 

 
11th century in Europe
11th century in Serbia
12th century in Serbia
Serbian royal families
Medieval Serbia
Medieval Montenegro